A secundogeniture (from  "following, second," and  "born") was a dependent territory given to a younger son of a princely house and his descendants, creating a cadet branch.  This was a special form of inheritance in which the second and younger son received more possessions and prestige than the apanage which was usual in principalities practising primogeniture.  It avoided the generational division of the estate to the extent that occurred under gavelkind, and at the same time gave younger branches a stake in the stability of the house.

Creation
The creation of a secundogeniture was often regulated by a house law.  The younger sons would receive some territory, but much less than the older brother, and they would not be sovereign.  Examples of such house laws would be
 the House Treaty of Gera in Brandenburg

A secundogeniture is different from a partition.  A partition creates two (or more) separate, largely independent states.  An example of a partition would be the division of Hesse after the death of Philip I of Hesse.  Nevertheless, there have been intermediate cases between a secundogeniture and a proper partition.

Examples 
 Armenia in 63 AD
 Brandenburg-Küstrin
 Brandenburg-Schwedt
 Habsburg-Tuscany
 Hesse-Homburg
 Hesse-Rotenburg
 Palatinate-Birkenfeld
 Palatinate-Sulzbach
 Saxe-Merseburg
 Saxe-Weissenfels
 Saxe-Zeitz
 Schleswig-Holstein-Sonderburg
 Württemberg-Mömpelgard

See also 
 Partitioned-off duke

Inheritance
Nobility
Fatherhood

Order of succession